Saeed Ghaedifar is a defender  who played for Fajr Sepasi in the Azadegan League.

Club career statistics 

Last Update: 1 August 2014

Honours

Club 
Sepahan
Iran Pro League (1): 2014–15

References 

Sepahan S.C. footballers
Khooshe Talaei players
1992 births
Living people
People from Yasuj
Iranian footballers
Association football fullbacks